Charles Harold James Handley (15 April 1899 – 1957) was an English professional footballer who played as a winger in the Football League for Tottenham Hotspur, Swansea Town and Thames.

History 
Handley was born in Edmonton, North London and, as a youngster, trained with his father in their back garden. After trying out at local team, Edmonton Juniors, Handley went on to play for other minor clubs but finally after enrolling in the Spurs youth before being called up by then current manager Peter McWilliam. From 1921–29, Charlie "Tich" Handley played for Tottenham Hotspur. He and Jimmy Dimmock another well known player were Tottenham's best strikers in that decade.

References

1899 births
1957 deaths
People from Edmonton, London
Association football outside forwards
English footballers
Tottenham Hotspur F.C. players
Swansea City A.F.C. players
Sittingbourne F.C. players
Sheppey United F.C. players
Thames A.F.C. players
Norwich City F.C. players
BSC Young Boys players
English Football League players